Ambulance Tasmania, formerly known as the Tasmanian Ambulance Service, provides ambulance services in the state of Tasmania, Australia. The service was established by the Ambulance Service Act 1982 and operates within the Department of Health.

Ambulance Tasmania responded to 83 797 incidents in the 2017-2018 period, making approximately 230 incidents per day. 34 653 of these were classed as emergency incidents.

Staffing

The service has approximately 600 volunteer officers and 378 paid staff,. 
Ambulance Tasmania uses a range of registered Paramedics, Intensive Care Paramedics and Extended Care Paramedics. In addition the service utilises Doctors and nurses in some circumstances. 
Patient transport staff are also utilized in urban areas.

Volunteers working with Ambulance Tasmania generally operate in one of two ways. Volunteer Ambulance Officers will respond on 000 calls on ambulances, either with a registered Paramedic or with another volunteer or in a response car where Community Emergency Response Teams (CERT) exist.

Volunteer Ambulance Officers operate from 41 of the 55 locations across the state. Ambulance Tasmania has four levels of volunteer ranging from non-clinical level 1 to level 4 where a volunteer can perform some clinical assessments and intervention alone.

Locations
Ambulance Tasmania operates from 55 locations across the state. These locations are staff with a mix of paid staff and volunteers depending on location.

14 locations are staffed only by paid Paramedics including the base at Launceston Airport with the Royal Flying Doctor Service.
20 locations are staffed by a single Paramedic who works with a volunteer. They may or may not work on call at night depending on the station.
17 locations staff ambulances with volunteers only. These stations make up approximately 5% of all calls.
4 locations are areas covered by Community Emergency Response Teams. They do no have an ambulance, rather respond in an ambulance provided car to begin treatment while an ambulance is on its way.

Funding
Ambulance Tasmania is funded through a combination of government grants/contributions, fees and subscription/other income sources. In the 2017–18 financial year the service was funded for the value of 75.8 million AUD.

This is up on the previous two financial years, being 64.8 million AUD and 58.6 million AUD respectively.

The service is generally provided free to Tasmanian residents.

In 2018 the state government announced a $125 million AUD investment in Ambulance Tasmania over the next four years, including upgraded Helicopter Emergency Medical Service, secondary triage, replacement stations and additional staff and training facilities.

Rescue

Two BK 117's operate out of Hobart airport as aeromedical helicopters which are shared with the Tasmanian Police contracted from the Tasmania Air Rescue Trust. These helicopters and both night flight and winch capable. They are fitted with high intensity spotlights and infrared cameras. Ambulance Tasmania staff this helicopter with Paramedics currently as the service has traditionally operated as a rescue service. In the future the aircraft will be staffed by both a Paramedic as well as six doctors and be remodelled to focus on emergency medicine.

Fleet

Ambulance Tasmania operates a fleet of 164 vehicles. This includes a fleet of Mercedes Sprinter ambulances. Most are used for Emergency Ambulance roles with a small amount being used for patient transport.

The service utilizes a number of rapid response vehicles for single responders such as CERT responders, officers or managers and specialist paramedics.

To access more remote parts of the state or when in inclement weather the service has a number of Toyota Land Cruiser 4x4 ambulances across the state.

Ambulance Tasmania also operates three special operations vehicles for bariatric, neonatal and scene command roles. There is one vehicle based in Hobart, Launceston and Burnie respectively.

See also 
Tasmania Police
Tasmania Fire Service
State Emergency Service

References

External links
 Official website
 Volunteer Ambulance Officers Association

Government agencies of Tasmania
Emergency services in Tasmania
Ambulance services in Australia
Health in Tasmania